The hertz (symbol: Hz) is the unit of frequency in the International System of Units (SI), equivalent to one event (or cycle) per second. The hertz is an SI derived unit whose expression in terms of SI base units is s−1, meaning that one hertz is the reciprocal of one second. It is named after Heinrich Rudolf Hertz (1857–1894), the first person to provide conclusive proof of the existence of electromagnetic waves. Hertz are commonly expressed in multiples: kilohertz (kHz), megahertz (MHz), gigahertz (GHz), terahertz (THz).

Some of the unit's most common uses are in the description of periodic waveforms and musical tones, particularly those used in radio- and audio-related applications. It is also used to describe the clock speeds at which computers and other electronics are driven. The units are sometimes also used as a representation of the energy of a photon, via the Planck relation E = hν, where E is the photon's energy, ν is its frequency, and h is the Planck constant.

Definition 
The hertz is equivalent to one cycle per second. The International Committee for Weights and Measures defined the second as "the duration of  periods of the radiation corresponding to the transition between the two hyperfine levels of the ground state of the caesium-133 atom" and then adds: "It follows that the hyperfine splitting in the ground state of the caesium 133 atom is exactly , ." The dimension of the unit hertz is 1/time (T−1). Expressed in base SI units, the unit is the reciprocal second (1/s).

In English, "hertz" is also used as the plural form. As an SI unit, Hz can be prefixed; commonly used multiples are kHz (kilohertz), MHz (megahertz), GHz (gigahertz) and THz (terahertz). One hertz simply means "one event per second" (where the event being counted may be a complete cycle);  means "one hundred events per second", and so on.

The occurrence rate of aperiodic or stochastic events is expressed in reciprocal second or inverse second (1/s or s−1) in general or, in the specific case of radioactivity, in becquerels. Whereas  is one cycle (or periodic event) per second,  is one radionuclide event per second on average.

Even though frequency, angular velocity, angular frequency and radioactivity all have the dimension T−1, of these only frequency is expressed using the unit hertz. The correspondence between a frequency f with the unit hertz and an angular velocity ω with the unit radians per second is
 and

History

The hertz is named after the German physicist Heinrich Hertz (1857–1894), who made important scientific contributions to the study of electromagnetism. The name was established by the International Electrotechnical Commission (IEC) in 1935. It was adopted by the General Conference on Weights and Measures (CGPM) (Conférence générale des poids et mesures) in 1960, replacing the previous name for the unit, "cycles per second" (cps), along with its related multiples, primarily "kilocycles per second" (kc/s) and "megacycles per second" (Mc/s), and occasionally "kilomegacycles per second" (kMc/s). The term "cycles per second" was largely replaced by "hertz" by the 1970s.

In some usage, the "per second" was omitted, so that "megacycles" (Mc) was used as an abbreviation of "megacycles per second" (that is, megahertz (MHz)).

Applications

Sound and vibration
Sound is a traveling longitudinal wave, which is an oscillation of pressure. Humans perceive the frequency of a sound as its pitch. Each musical note corresponds to a particular frequency. The range of ultrasound, infrasound and other physical vibrations such as molecular and atomic vibrations extends from a few femtohertz into the terahertz range and beyond.

Electromagnetic radiation
Electromagnetic radiation is often described by its frequency—the number of oscillations of the perpendicular electric and magnetic fields per second—expressed in hertz.

Radio frequency radiation is usually measured in kilohertz (kHz), megahertz (MHz), or gigahertz (GHz). Light is electromagnetic radiation that is even higher in frequency, and has frequencies in the range of tens (infrared) to thousands (ultraviolet) of terahertz. Electromagnetic radiation with frequencies in the low terahertz range (intermediate between those of the highest normally usable radio frequencies and long-wave infrared light) is often called terahertz radiation. Even higher frequencies exist, such as that of gamma rays, which can be measured in exahertz (EHz). (For historical reasons, the frequencies of light and higher frequency electromagnetic radiation are more commonly specified in terms of their wavelengths or photon energies: for a more detailed treatment of this and the above frequency ranges, see Electromagnetic spectrum.)

Computers

In computers, most central processing units (CPU) are labeled in terms of their clock rate expressed in megahertz or gigahertz. This specification refers to the frequency of the CPU's master clock signal. This signal is nominally a square wave, which is an electrical voltage that switches between low and high logic levels at regular intervals. As the hertz has become the primary unit of measurement accepted by the general populace to determine the performance of a CPU, many experts have criticized this approach, which they claim is an easily manipulable benchmark. Some processors use multiple clock cycles to perform a single operation, while others can perform multiple operations in a single cycle.

Various computer buses, such as the front-side bus connecting the CPU and northbridge, also operate at various frequencies in the megahertz range.

SI multiples 

Higher frequencies than the International System of Units provides prefixes for are believed to occur naturally in the frequencies of the quantum-mechanical vibrations of massive particles, although these are not directly observable and must be inferred through other phenomena. By convention, these are typically not expressed in hertz, but in terms of the equivalent energy, which is proportional to the frequency by the factor of the Planck constant.

Unicode

The CJK Compatibility block in Unicode contains characters for common SI units for frequency. These are intended for compatibility with East Asian character encodings, and not for use in new documents (which would be expected to use Latin letters, e.g. "MHz").

See also 
 Alternating current
 Bandwidth (signal processing)
 Electronic tuner
 FLOPS
 Frequency changer
 Normalized frequency (signal processing)
 Orders of magnitude (frequency)
 Periodic function
 Radian per second
 Rate
 Sampling rate

Notes and references

External links
 SI Brochure: Unit of time (second)
 National Research Council of Canada: Cesium fountain clock
 National Research Council of Canada: Optical frequency standard based on a single trapped ion (archived 23 December 2013)
 National Research Council of Canada: Optical frequency comb (archived 27 June 2013)
 National Physical Laboratory: Time and frequency Optical atomic clocks
 Online Tone Generator

SI derived units
Units of frequency
Heinrich Hertz